Aigneville is a commune in the Somme department in Hauts-de-France in northern France.

Geography

Population

See also
Communes of the Somme department

References

External links

(All French language)
 Aigneville on the website of Quid

Communes of Somme (department)